This article provides details of international football games played by the Tunisia national football team from 2020 to present.

Results

2020

2021

2022

Forthcoming fixtures
The following matches are scheduled:

2023

Head to head records

References

Tunisia national football team results
2020s in Tunisian sport